Ian Stanley "Bluey" Shelton (24 February 1940 – 17 March 2021), known throughout his career as "Bluey", due to his thatch of red hair, was an Australian rules footballer, who played with Essendon in the Victorian Football League (VFL) during the 1960s.

Family
The son of Stanley Charles Shelton (1903–1983) and Jean Shelton (died 1978), née Dickens, Ian was born on 24 February 1940. He married Margery Henrietta Elliot on 26 March 1966.

He is the nephew of John Thomas "Jack" Shelton (1905–1941), who played for St Kilda and South Melbourne, and the cousin of Bill Shelton, who played with Hawthorn.

Ned Kelly
As a young lad of 7, his grandfather, Richard Shelton, was saved from drowning in swollen Hughes Creek, Avenel by a young Ned Kelly, aged 10.

VFL Footballer
Recruited from the Avenel-Longwood Football Club, Shelton was a strong, courageous, and talented footballer, able to kick well with both feet, who played at centre half-back for Essendon for 91 games, in six seasons, kicking two goals.
"Bluey" Shelton, [Essendon's] 1965 vice-captain, was a big, rugged, red-headed centre half back who would go through a brick wall if necessary to clear the ball from the opposing goals. (Mapleston, 1996, p.204)

1959
Shelton came to Essendon, as a centre half-back, from Avenel in 1959. There were a number of delays in him getting a clearance from Avenel and a permit play from the VFL was not granted until 20 May 1959. Consequently, he was not eligible to play his first match for Essendon until the (round 5) match against Geelong on 23 May 1959, when he was selected to replace the team's regular centre half-back, Jeff Gamble, who was injured and unable to play. Shelton was one of Essendon's best players in a team that (unexpectedly) beat Geelong by 30 points: 11.18 (84) to 7.12 (54).

All in all, in his first season with Essendon, he played in seven senior home-and-away games, all three finals, including the Grand Final, where he played at centre half-back, in Essendon's 37 point loss — 11.12 (78) to 17.13 (115) — earned three votes in the Brownlow medal, and won the award for Essendon's best first year player.

1962

In 1962, Shelton played representative football for Victoria in 1962: against Tasmania on 17 June, and against South Australia on 14 July, he played in Essendon's 1962 premiership team at centre half-back in a team that defeated Carlton by 32 points — 13.12 (90) to 8.19 (58) — and was runner-up, to John Birt, as Essendon's best and fairest player.

1964
He did not play for the entire 1964 season due to an extremely serious eye injury he suffered in November 1963, "necessitating serious operations and treatment" (Maplestone, 1966, p.198):
"Ian Shelton is expected to leave the Eye and Ear Hospital tomorrow after an operation to his right eye. A fragment of steel lodged in Shelton's eye as he was watching a mechanic repair a tractor on his farm at Avenel, two weeks ago".
"Although Essendon centre half-back Ian Shelton has little chance of playing this year [viz., 1964] because of an eye injury, he has been placed on Essendon's list 'to be considered when available'."

1965
Although only able to see out of one eye, he returned to Essendon in 1965, and was appointed the team's vice captain. He broke his hand early in the season, and was out for three games; and, later in the season, sustained a serious knee injury that kept him out of action for four matches. He finished his final season playing in 14 games; the last being his third Grand Final, and his second premiership team.

On the day of the 1965 Grand Final, with a severe shoulder injury (the severity of which had been kept secret from the public),  Shelton was "in two minds [before the match] as to whether to play because he didn't want to let the team down" by under-performing; however, "he was persuaded half an hour before the game by skipper Ken Fraser and the club doctor to take the field".

1966
He was released by Essendon in 1966, because they could not come to a mutually satisfactory arrangement for him to commute between Avenel and Essendon.

1975
In 1975, he was the official runner for the Essendon Football Club.

Country Football

Avenel-Longwood
In 1958 he was playing with the Avenel-Longwood Football Club.

Seymour
He was captain-coach of the Seymour Football Club, in the Waranga North East Football League (WNEFL), from 1966 to 1969.  He was coach of the Seymour (Goulburn Valley Football League) premiership team in 1982.

Avenel-Longwood
He was captain-coach of the Avenel-Longwood Football Club in 1970, 1971, 1972, and 1974, and was the club's best and fairest in 1971 and 1972.

Awards 
 1959: Essendon Football Club — Best First-Year Player.
 1962: Essendon Football Club — Outstanding Services Award.
 1997: Essendon Football Club — One of Essendon's "Top 60 Players" (of a total of 1,001 potential candidates) from which the 25 members of the "Essendon Team of the Century" were chosen. 
 2005: Essendon Football Club — Life Membership.
 2012: Seymour Football Club — Centre Half-Back in Seymour's "Team of the Century".
 2012: Seymour Football Club — Coach of Seymour's "Team of the Century".
 2016: Essendon Football Club — Centre Half-Back in Essendon's "Team of the Country".

Footnotes

References
 Conway, S. "Shelton's Country Outlook", Essendon Football Club, 15 April 2016.
 Maplestone, M., Flying Higher: History of the Essendon Football Club 1872–1996, Essendon Football Club, (Melbourne), 1996. 
 Ross, J. (ed), 100 Years of Australian Football 1897–1996: The Complete Story of the AFL, All the Big Stories, All the Great Pictures, All the Champions, Every AFL Season Reported, Viking, (Ringwood), 1996.

External links
 
 
 Champions of Essendon Profile: Ian Shelton
 Essendon Football Club: Six New Life Members Inducted, 20 December 2005.

1940 births
2021 deaths
Australian rules footballers from Victoria (Australia)
Essendon Football Club players
Essendon Football Club Premiership players
Seymour Football Club players
Two-time VFL/AFL Premiership players